Descendants of Cain (카인의 후예 - Kaineui huye) is a 1968 South Korean film directed by Yu Hyun-mok.

Plot
An anti-communist film depicting North Koreans extorting the land and property of civilians in the name of revolution after the liberation from Japan in 1945.

Cast
Kim Jin-kyu as Pak Hun
Moon Hee as O Jang-nyeo
Park Nou-sik as Do-seop
Jang Dong-he
Jeong Min
Choe Bong
Yang Hun
Jang hoon
Kim Chil-seong
Seong So-min

Awards
At the Blue Dragon Film Awards in 1968, it won the award for Best Film. The film was also selected as the South Korean entry for the Best Foreign Language Film at the 41st Academy Awards, but was not accepted as a nominee.

See also
List of submissions to the 41st Academy Awards for Best Foreign Language Film
List of South Korean submissions for the Academy Award for Best Foreign Language Film

References

External links

Best Picture Blue Dragon Film Award winners
1960s Korean-language films
South Korean historical drama films
Films directed by Yu Hyun-mok